My Sweet Lady is a song written and first recorded by John Denver, and was included on his, Poems, Prayers & Promises LP in 1971. 

Denver released it as a single in 1977. Record World said that "a  lilting string arrangement complements his sincere vocal and gentle acoustic guitar work."

Cliff DeYoung recording
It was later covered by American actor and musician Cliff DeYoung, whose 1973 MCA Records release  became an international hit peaking at No. 7 Billboard Adult Contemporary chart and No. 17 on the Billboard Hot 100, No. 14 in Canada and No. 42 in Australia.

Chart performance

References

1973 singles
Songs written by John Denver
MCA Records singles
1971 songs